Barbilla National Park is a National Park in the Caribbean La Amistad Conservation Area of Costa Rica located on the eastern slopes of the Cordillera de Talamanca.  It protects forests as well as Laguna Ayil and Cerro Tigre and the Dantas River watershed, covering parts of both Cartago and Limón Provinces. It was initially established in 1982.

The park protects over 29,500 acres (11,938 ha) of humid lowlands tropical forest. It's one of the country's least-visited parks; this has allowed the park to remain ecologically rich and diverse. Rare (and even endangered) species live within the park, including jaguars, ocelots, pumas, and tapirs. The park also protects the Dantas River Watershed, which is an important source of water for the people and animals of the region.

The Barbilla National Park is also the home of the second largest indigenous group in Costa Rica, the Cabécar people. It's also located next to the Chirripó Indigenous Reserve

The Park has the Barbilla Biological Station on site, as well as an administrative building located in Brisas de Pacuarito. Access is via an unpaved road, 17 km long and about an hour of driving. The start of the road is 2–3 km east of Siquirres.

The buildings are actually located outside of the park. The path into the park descends through indigenous farms to the Dantas river. The main trail crosses the river and climbs the opposite hill (heading due south). There are few smaller trails.

References

External links
 Barbilla National Park at Costa Rica National Parks

National parks of Costa Rica
Protected areas established in 1982
Geography of Limón Province
Geography of Cartago Province
Tourist attractions in Limón Province
Tourist attractions in Cartago Province
1982 establishments in Costa Rica